Cowbridge Cricket Ground is a cricket ground in Cowbridge, Glamorgan.  The first recorded match held on the ground came in 1895 when the creator of the ground,  E H Ebsworth's XI played The Rev'd Owen Jones' XI.

Overview
The early years saw the ground being used by the Ebsworth XI, The Glamorgan Gypsies and Cowbridge Wanderers. The Wanderers were given the opportunity to purchase the ground  at a price significantly less than the original cost and construction. The Wanderers were re-formed into The Cowbridge and District Athletic Club which remains the parent body to the sporting sections. Glamorgan played Northamptonshire in a ground first first-class match in the 1931 County Championship.  In 1931 and 1932, the ground played host to four first-class matches, two each season, the last of which saw Glamorgan play Somerset.

In local domestic cricket, the ground is the home venue of Cowbridge Cricket Club.

References

External links
Cowbridge Ground on CricketArchive
Cowbridge Ground on Cricinfo

Buildings and structures in the Vale of Glamorgan
Sport in the Vale of Glamorgan
Cricket grounds in Glamorgan
Glamorgan County Cricket Club